The Interstate River Water Disputes Act, 1956 (IRWD Act) is an Act of the Parliament of India enacted under Article 262 of Constitution of India on the eve of reorganization of states on linguistic basis to resolve the water disputes that would arise in the use, control and distribution of an interstate river or river valley.  Article 262 of the Indian Constitution provides a role for the union government in adjudicating conflicts surrounding interstate rivers that arise among the state/regional governments.   This Act further has undergone amendments subsequently and its most recent amendment took place in the year 2002.

River waters use / harnessing is included in states jurisdiction (entry 17 of state list, Schedule 7 of Indian Constitution). However, the union government with parliament approval can make laws on regulation and development of interstate rivers and river valleys to the extent such water resources are directly under its control when expedient in the public interest (entry 56 of union list, Schedule 7 of Indian Constitution). Damodar Valley Corporation, NHPC, River Boards Act 1956, etc under the control of the union government, are referable to Entry 56 of the union list. When union government wants to take over an interstate river project under its control by law (as provided in the constitution) from states per entry 56 of the union list, it has to take the approval of the riparian states' legislature assemblies before passing such bill in the Parliament per Article 252 of the constitution. When public interest is served, President may also establish an interstate council as per Article 263 to inquire and recommend the dispute that has arisen between the states of India.

IRWD Act (section 2c2) validates the previous agreements (if any) among the basin states to harness the water of an interstate river/ river valley. This act is confined to states of India and not applicable to union territories. Only concerned state governments are entitled to participate in the tribunal adjudication and non-government entities are not permitted. 

Any river water sharing treaty made with other countries, has to be ratified by the Parliament per Article 253 after deciding the share of the Indian riparian states per Article 262 to make the treaty constitutionally valid or enforceable by the judiciary as India follows dualist theory for the implementation of international treaties/laws. The Indian government has signed Indus Waters Treaty with Pakistan, Ganga water sharing treaty with Bangladesh, etc. without the ratification by the Parliament and the consent of the concerned riparian states per Article 252.

Water disputes
IRWD Act is applicable only to interstate rivers/river valleys. An action of one state should affect the interests of one or more other states. Then only water dispute is deemed to have arisen under IRWD Act (section 3). It can be divided into two independent parts for clarity purpose in understanding the techno-legal application of the IRWD Act.

Actions of a downstream state affecting the interest of an upstream state
A downstream state's action can affect the upstream state's interest only in one case. i.e. when a downstream state is building a dam/barrage near its state boundary and submerging the territory of an upstream state on permanent/temporary basis. Other than this action, no other action of a downstream state could affect the upstream state's interest which they have been using for economic, ecological and spiritual/ religious aspects. The meaning of the word ‘interest’ in this context is concern/importance/significance/relevance / consequence of losing the prevailing water use or purpose.

Actions of an upstream state affecting the interest of a downstream state
Whereas all the actions of an upstream state to use or control or distribute the water of an interstate river can affect the downstream states in one way or other. The following are some examples but not complete:

Consuming river water for any beneficial use such as irrigation, drinking water, industrial, recreation, recharging of groundwater, groundwater use, enhanced evaporation losses, enhancing rainwater use efficiency, obstructing non-flood flows of the river, transferring water to outside the river basin, etc. (i.e. any man-made /aided action of converting water into water vapor & losing to the atmosphere by evapotranspiration / evaporation processes and also transferring river water outside the river basin). This is generally done by constructing water storage reservoirs and subsequently using water for the above purposes.
Quality of water can also be diminished/altered/ controlled in the action of using water. It would take place by accumulating the dissolved salts in the remaining water after its use. The dissolved salts content of water increases due to its consumption and also the addition of more salts by anthropogenic activity. Also causing water more silt laden/turbid is a man-made water quality alteration that can be caused by mining and deforestation activities. Bringing water from other river basins for upstream states' use also affects water quality in downstream states.

Generally, river water is transferred to water deficit areas for use after creating the infrastructure for its storage (water reservoirs) and distribution network (canals, pipelines, groundwater charging, etc.). All these acts fall under the river water distribution and control category under IRWD Act. All the above actions of an upstream state are legal causes of water dispute to the downstream states since their existing interests are affected as given below:

 Decrease in water availability:- When an upstream state contemplates water use, it would block the lean season river flows initially by constructing low-cost barrages and tries to store the peak flood waters ultimately by constructing massive water storage reservoirs. In this process, the river flow regime is altered drastically converting it to ephemeral/dry in most of the time except during floods. It also alters the ecology of the river located in downstream states affecting its riverine vegetation and aquatic flora & fauna. Already the delta area of rivers is eroding/shrinking when adequate river water is not reaching the sea. This process of river water harnessing affects the downstream state's interests as they are deprived of constantly available river water which they had been using for their interests. Alternatively, the downstream state needs to store more flood water in reservoirs to cater to the existing water use.
 Deterioration in water quality:- If the water use is 75% of the total available water in the river, the concentration of the dissolved salts in the river water increases by four folds. Alteration in river water quality / alkalinity / salinity effects growth of traditionally cultivated crops as they are not best suitable with the enhanced soil alkalinity and or soil salinity. They either give a lesser yield or consume more saline water for the same yield. Also the aquatic flora & fauna would face survival threat / diminished growth with the enhanced water salinity and or alkalinity. If the river is blocked to reach the Sea (i.e. basin closure) in most of the years, the ecology/fisheries of the surrounding Sea/river mouth area is also affected. Also there is a threat of Sea water ingress into estuaries/delta of the river contaminating groundwater.

The use or control or distribution of river water in an upstream state is invariably denial of prevailing use/purpose in the downstream state as it is altering the natural flow regime of river water with respect to quantity, quality and time of availability in downstream states. Also dam failures in upstream states can create flash floods or further dam failures in downstream states causing unprecedented property damage and loss of human lives. IRWD Act (section 3) clearly stipulates that mere anticipation of a riparian state actions which can affect other riparian state interests is enough to raise interstate water dispute.

The activities of an upstream state without affecting downstream states' interests are peak flood control measures by impounding the flood waters only (not base flows) in 100% or more capacity storage reservoirs for use without affecting water quality appreciably and run-off hydropower generation took up in its territory.

Constitution of Tribunal
Whenever the riparian states are not able to reach amicable agreements on their own in sharing of interstate river waters, section 4 of the IRWD Act provides a dispute resolution process in the form of a Tribunal.  As per section 5.2 of the Act, the tribunal shall not only adjudicate but also investigate the matters referred to it by the union government and forward a report setting out the facts with its decisions. It implies that the tribunal's responsibility is not limited to adjudication of issues raised by the concerned states and also the investigation of other aspects which are in the public domain such as water pollution, salt export requirement, water quality deterioration, flood control, sustainability of river basin productivity & its ecology, environmental flow requirements, climate change effects, etc. When the tribunal final verdict issued based on the deliberations on the draft verdict is accepted by the union government and notified in the official gazette, the verdict becomes law and binding on the states and union government for implementation. In case the constitutional rights of states are ingressed upon by the tribunal award in any manner, the union government is obliged to take the consent of parliament and all riparian states under Article 252 of the constitution before publishing the tribunal awards in the official gazette. When pronounced in the ambit of IRWD Act and the Indian constitution, the tribunal's verdict after its publication in the official gazette is equivalent to Supreme Court verdict as per section 6 of IRWD Act.

Amendment 2002
This amendment (second para of section 4 (1) of the Act) specifically does not permit altering the prevailing tribunal verdicts issued before the year 2002 (i.e. but not the tribunal awards issued after the year 2002). Thus this amendment bars the tribunals to give any time period/validity for constituting a new tribunal. This is to keep provision to resolve freshwater disputes which were not addressed by earlier tribunals/ agreements as and when they surface.

Amendment bills
A permanent water dispute tribunal, with its members from sitting/retired judges of Supreme Court or High courts (maximum five including chairman and vice chairman) and technical experts (maximum three), is proposed to resolve the growing number of interstate river water disputes expeditiously. A tribunal bench shall have one technical expert member and one judicial member with the chairman or vice chairman out of the members of the permanent water dispute tribunal.

Section 5 (2a) of the amended Act mandated that the tribunal report shall also prescribe for the distribution of water among the states during distress situations arising from a shortage in river water availability.

The Union government is contemplating bringing a new act in place of the River Boards Act, 1956 which is presently purely an advisory body of the union government. The new bill called "River basin Management Bill" would constitute River Basin Organisations for each interstate river basin with a two-tier structure. The lower tier 'Executive Board' of a river basin is represented by various relevant faculties from each riparian state including the union government. The top tier called the 'Governing Council' of a river basin will have all chief ministers of riparian states as its members to arrive at unanimous decisions. In case of no consensus decision, the dispute would be referred to the tribunal formed under Interstate River Water Disputes Act, 1956.

Inter-State River Water Disputes Amendment Bill, 2019 : The Inter-State River Water Disputes Amendment Bill was introduced in Lok Sabha on 25th July,2019 by the minister of Jal Shakti, Mr.Gajendra Singh Shekhawat. It amends the Inter-State River Water Disputes Act, 1956.  The Act provides for the adjudication of disputes relating to waters of inter-state rivers and river valleys.

 Under the Act, a state government may request the central government to refer an inter-state river dispute to a Tribunal for adjudication. If the central government is of the opinion that the dispute cannot be settled through negotiations, it is required to set up a Water Disputes Tribunal for adjudication of the dispute, within a year of receiving such a complaint.  The Bill seeks to replace this mechanism. 
 Disputes Resolution Committee: Under the Bill, when a state puts in a request regarding any water dispute, the central government will set up a Disputes Resolution Committee (DRC), to resolve the dispute amicably.  The DRC will consist of a Chairperson, and experts with at least 15 years of experience in relevant sectors, to be nominated by the central government.  It will also include one member from each state (at the Joint Secretary level), who is party to the dispute, to be nominated by the concerned state government. 
 The DRC will seek to resolve the dispute through negotiations, within one year (extendable by six months), and submit its report to the central government. If a dispute cannot be settled by the DRC, the central government will refer it to the Inter-State River Water Disputes Tribunal.  Such referral must be made within three months from the receipt of the report from the DRC. 
 Tribunal: The central government will set up an Inter-State River Water Disputes Tribunal, for the adjudication of water disputes.  This Tribunal can have multiple benches.  All existing Tribunals will be dissolved, and the water disputes pending adjudication before such existing Tribunals will be transferred to the new Tribunal. 
 Composition of the Tribunal: The Tribunal will consist of a Chairperson, Vice-Chairperson, three judicial members, and three expert members.  They will be appointed by the central government on the recommendation of a Selection Committee.  Each Tribunal Bench will consist of a Chairperson or Vice-Chairperson, a judicial member, and an expert member.  The central government may also appoint two experts serving in the Central Water Engineering Service as assessors to advise the Bench in its proceedings.  The assessor should not be from the state which is a party to the dispute.
 Time frames: Under the Act, the Tribunal must give its decision within three years, which may be extended by two years.  Under the Bill, the proposed Tribunal must give its decision on the dispute within two years, which may be extended by another year. Under the Act, if the matter is again referred to the Tribunal by a state for further consideration, the Tribunal must submit its report to the central government within a period of one year. This period can be extended by the central government.  The Bill amends this to specify that such extension may be up to a maximum of six months.

Dams safety act, 2021
Parliament passed the Dams Safety Act, 2021 under article 256 to monitor the safety of aging dams located on all rivers of India. As it is covering all the rivers in India instead of interstate rivers, a petition was filed in High Court against such act challenging its constitutional validity.

Tribunal awards

Till now three tribunal awards are notified in official gazette by the Government of India. These are water dispute tribunals allocating river water use by the riparian states for Krishna (tribunal 1), Godavari and Narmada rivers. All these tribunal awards were issued before the year 2002 which cannot be altered by the new tribunals. The tribunals formed on sharing water of Ravi & Beas rivers, Cauvery / Kaveri river, Vamsadhara River, Mahadayi / Mandovi River and Krishna River (tribunal 2 ) are either yet to pronounce the verdicts or the issued verdicts are to be accepted by the Government of India.

Cauvery water disputes tribunal order was notified by the GoI on 20 February 2013 and later Supreme Court amended the tribunal order.

The Vamsadhara tribunal pronounced its final verdict in September 2017 and permitted AP state to construct the side weir at Katragedda and Neradi barrage.

In March 2018, Mahanadi Water Disputes Tribunal is formed under the direction of the Supreme Court to adjudicate water sharing dispute between Odisha and Chhattisgarh states.

The Mahadayi Water Tribunal pronounced its final verdict in August 2018 and permitted Karnataka state to use water outside the basin for drinking water use. The tribunal has not vacated the stay order on the execution of works by Karnataka till the verdict is notified by a gazette order by the Union.

Establishment of authorities to implement a tribunal verdict
Under Section 6A of this Act, central government may frame a scheme or schemes to give effect to the decision of a tribunal. Each scheme has a provision to establish an authority for the implementation of a tribunal verdict. However, every scheme and all its regulations shall be approved by the parliament. When a tribunal verdict, after formally gazetted by the union government, stipulates to establish the verdict implementation authority/board, the same shall be complied by the union government as the tribunal verdict is equal to Supreme Court verdict. As per Articles 53 & 142 of the constitution, it is the duty of the President to enforce the tribunal/supreme court order/verdict without time delay till the Parliament, under Section 6A of this Act, decides against or makes modifications to the already established implementation board/authority.

In the case of the Cauvery River basin, SC directed the GoI to set up a temporary Supervisory Committee to implement the tribunal order till the constitution of the Cauvery Management Board by GoI.  GoI established the said temporary Supervisory Committee on 22 May 2013. In the case of Babli barrage dispute, SC itself constituted the Supervisory Committee to implement the water sharing agreement between Maharashtra and Andhra Pradesh in middle Godavari sub-basin.

After nearly 7 years, the KRMB and Godavari River Management Board are notified by the central govt as autonomous bodies and their project-wise functions are stipulated for implementation.

Data bank and information system
Under Section 9A of this Act, the central government shall maintain a data bank and information system at the national level for each river basin. State governments shall provide all the data regarding water resources, land, agriculture and matters related thereto as requested by the central government. The central government is also vested with powers to verify the data supplied by the state governments. However, many state governments, e.g., Maharashtra, Chattishgarh, etc have not been furnishing the land use data in their states  (Tables 14 to 16 of Integrated Hydrological Data Book, 2012) and Central Water Commission of MoWR is not pursuing the matter earnestly to get the data which is vital in water resources planning.

See also 

 Helsinki Rules
 Krishna Water Disputes Tribunal
 Godavari Water Disputes Tribunal
 Narmada Water Disputes Tribunal
 Kaveri River water dispute
 Water right
 Water law
 Environment of India
 Kalpasar Project
 List of rivers by dissolved load
 Ground water in India
 Indian Rivers Inter-link
 Irrigation in India
 List of drainage basins by area
 List of rivers of India by discharge
 List of rivers by discharge
 List of dams and reservoirs in India
 Pollution of the Ganges
 National Water Policy
 Saemangeum Seawall
 Water scarcity in India
 Water supply and sanitation in India
 Water pollution in India

External links 
 Water: Towards a Paradigm Shift in the Twelfth Plan, Planning Commission by Mihir Shah 
 IWMI Research report nos # 1, 3, 14, 56, 72, 83, 107, 111, 121, 123, 125 etc.
 Indian climate change from Harappa period.

References 

1956 in the environment
Inter-state disputes in India
Acts of the Parliament of India 1956
/
Water disputes in India
Environmental law in India